The Vancouver Asian Film Festival (VAFF) is an annual film festival held in Vancouver, British Columbia for about 4–5 days in November.  Launching in 1996, it is Canada’s oldest Asian film festival, exhibiting films and videos by North American artists of Asian heritage. It was founded in 1995 and debuted in September 1997. Since then, tens of thousands of film lovers have experienced a diverse selection of North American-Asian and international films.

Each year VAFF attracts close to 4,000 audience members over its four-day festival and year-round events. It also reaches many more through word of mouth, pre-festival events, and traditional and social media throughout the year.

Awards include a juried award for Best Canadian Short. Categories include: Narrative (i.e. drama, comedy, romance), Documentary, Animation, and Experimental.  Visiting artists have included Tzi Ma, Osric Chau, Ham Tran, Justin Lin, Michael Kang and Jessica Yu, as well as BC filmmakers, Mina Shum and Julia Kwan.  The festival has been host to major stars such as Grace Park and others.

VAFF is a not-for-profit organization. VAFF is entirely organized and produced by a group of dedicated volunteers, and is made possible by generous financial support from corporate sponsors, public funders and private donors.

Mission
VAFF strives to promote dynamic and innovative images of Asians, especially Canadian Asians, in roles usually not found in mainstream film and television with the belief that in order to have these images, the creative control and storytelling must come from the Asian Canadian communities themselves and the support must begin with these independent Asian filmmakers. Therefore, this festival was created to showcase their works to both Asian and non-Asian audiences. This festival aims to include all Canadian communities and to develop open and appreciative communications between all communities in Vancouver.

Awards

Other Events & Programs

Mighty Asian Moviemaking Marathon (MAMM)
Make an 8-minute short film in 10 days.

Red Packet Challenge (RPC)
RPC is a fun contest for anyone with a video camera or smartphone, as well as for trained and experienced filmmakers to showcase their storytelling skills in an ultra-short format. Vancouver Asian Film Festival offers an educational experience and an opportunity to showcase their work live on the big screen, online and to potential distributors. Films featuring the joys of eating, lucky money and growing up Chinese in Vancouver were just a few of the winners at the inaugural Red Packet Challenge (RPC) from the Vancouver Asian Film Festival (VAFF).

Ultra Shorts Competition 
 Reckless Coast Pictures 15 Seconds Of Mukbang (Ultimate Fan Choice Award)
 Mama Says
 KoreanCanuck

References

External links
 

Asian-Canadian culture in Vancouver
Film festivals in Vancouver
Asian-Canadian cinema
Film festivals established in 1996
1996 establishments in British Columbia